The Marseille Memorial is a steel obelisk commemorating the deaths of 1.5 million Armenians in Ottoman Empire during the Armenian genocide in 1915. The monument was dedicated in 1973 in Marseille, France.

France has a large Armenian community, with up to 600,000 people of Armenian descent.

The monument is located beside the Armenian church at avenue du Prado.

See also
Franco-Armenian relations
List of Armenian genocide memorials
Armenian genocide
Armenian Genocide Remembrance Day

Armenian genocide memorials
Monuments and memorials in France